The HXD1C（和谐1C型电力机车） is an electric locomotive developed by CSR Zhuzhou Electric Locomotive Co., Ltd. The design was revealed in 2009: a 7.2 MW power six axle, 150-tonne, Co'Co' locomotive.

This type of locomotive can draft a 5000-5500t freight train at a gradient of not more than 12‰ of middle-east lines in China. It has high cost performance and distinct comprehensive environmental protection, energy-saving and economic benefits, and meanwhile, it is another main locomotive of Chinese railway transportation in future.  An Ethiopian variant has been built for Addis Ababa-Djibouti Railway.

Galleries

Manufacturers
HXD1Cs have been manufactured by several companies:
 Zhuzhou Electric Locomotive Company Limited
 Ziyang Locomotive Works
 CRRC Qishuyan Locomotive Co., Ltd.

See also
 China Railways HXD1
 China Railways HXD1B
 List of locomotives in China

References 

Electric locomotives of China
25 kV AC locomotives
Standard gauge locomotives of China
Railway locomotives introduced in 2009